Professor Karim Vessal is an Iranian Physician and a pioneer of radiology and nuclear medicine in Iran.

Biography
Karim Vessal (born 1933 in Shiraz, Iran).

Education
He completed his high school education in Iran and then moved on to Austria to continue his education in the University of Vienna. Following earning MD degree, Vessal completed an Internship and Residency at University of Berlin.

References

Iranian medical researchers
Living people
Year of birth missing (living people)